Buna (Serbian Cyrillic: Буна) is a populated settlement at the confluence of the Buna river and Neretva river some 10 km downstream the Neretva and south of Mostar, Herzegovina-Neretva Canton, Bosnia and Herzegovina.

The famous source of the Buna river (Vrelo Bune) is a strong karstic spring. The Buna river flows west from its source for approximately 9 kilometres and joins the Neretva near the village Buna.

Demographics 
According to the 2013 census, its population was 1,291.

See also 
 Blagaj, Mostar
 Bunica
 Vrelo Bunice
 Bregava
 Stolac
 Trebižat
 Hutovo Blato

References 

Populated places in Mostar
Villages in the Federation of Bosnia and Herzegovina